The Tolman electronic parameter (TEP) is a measure of the electron donating or withdrawing ability of a ligand. It is determined by measuring the frequency of the A1 C-O vibrational mode (ν(CO)) of a (pseudo)-C3v symmetric complex, [LNi(CO)3] by infrared spectroscopy, where L is the ligand of interest. [LNi(CO)3] was chosen as the model compound because such complexes are readily prepared from tetracarbonylnickel(0). The shift in ν(CO) is used to infer the electronic properties of a ligand, which can aid in understanding its behavior in other complexes. The analysis was introduced by Chadwick A. Tolman.

The A1 carbonyl band is rarely obscured by other bands in the analyte's infrared spectrum. Carbonyl is a small ligand so steric factors do not complicate the analysis. Upon coordination of CO to a metal, ν(CO) typically decreases from 2143 cm−1 of free CO. This shift can be explained by π backbonding: the metal forms a π bond with the carbonyl ligand by donating electrons through its d orbitals into the empty π* anti-bonding orbitals on CO. This interaction strengthens the metal-carbon bond but also weakens the carbon-oxygen bond, resulting in a lower vibrational frequency. If other ligands increase the density of π electrons on the metal, the C-O bond is weakened and ν(CO) decreases further; conversely, if other ligands compete with CO for π backbonding, ν(CO) increases.

Other ligand electronic parameters
Several other scales have been proposed for the ranking of the donor properties of ligands.  The HEP scale ranks ligands on the basis of the 13C NMR shift of a reference ligand.  Lever's electronic parameter ranking is related to the Ru(II/III) couple. Another scale evaluated ligands on the basis of the redox couples of [Cr(CO)5L]0/+.

In a treatment akin to the TEP analysis, the donor properties of N-heterocyclic carbene (NHC) ligands have been ranked according to IR data recorded on cis-[RhCl(NHC)(CO)2] complexes.

See also
 Metal carbonyl
 Tolman cone angle

References

Further reading
 
 

Organometallic chemistry
Inorganic chemistry
Infrared spectroscopy